PNKD is the abbreviation for a human neurological movement disorder  paroxysmal nonkinesiogenic dyskinesia. Like many other human genetics disorders, PNKD also refers to the disease, the disease gene and the encoded protein. (PNKD) is a protein that in humans is encoded by the PNKD gene. Alternative splicing results in the transcription of three isoforms.  The mouse ortholog is called brain protein 17 (Brp17).

Structure 
This gene is located on chromosome 2 at the band 2q35 and contains 12 exons. At least three isoforms of varying lengths (long, medium, and short) can be produced by alternative splicing of this gene. While the gene products of the long (PNKD-L) and medium (PNKD-M) isoforms contain the C-terminal β-lactamase domain, the short (PNKD-S) isoform, commonly referred to as myofibrillogenesis regulator-1 (MR-1), contains only three exons and lacks homology to any known protein. These isoforms also differ in their tissue-specific expression and subcellular localization. Specifically, PNKD-L is only expressed in the central nervous system whereas PNKD-M and PNKD-S are ubiquitously expressed across tissues. Moreover, PNKD-L localizes to the cell membrane, PNKD-S to the cytoplasm and nucleus, and PNKD-M to the mitochondrion.

Function 

The function of PNKD proteins are unknown but the long and medium isoforms of PNKD contain a conserved β-lactamase domain which suggest it may function as an enzyme. The closest mammalian homolog to PNKD is  HAGH, an enzyme involves in a two-step reaction to hydrolyze SLG and produce D-lactic acid and reduced GSH. However, the hydrolytic activity of PNKD is minimal.

The long form of PNKD is neuronal specific and encodes a synaptic protein that localizes dominantly to the pre-synaptic membrane. Post-synaptic area and vesicular structure also occasionally has PNKD long form. PNKD long form interacts with pre-synaptic protein RIM and inhibits synaptic exocytosis. PNKD with disease mutations is less effective in inhibition thus the synaptic release is increased. This would cause excessive neurotransmitter release in the brain and maybe the root cause for triggering epilepsy in PNKD patients.

Clinical significance 

Point mutations in PNKD exon 1 cause an inherited neurological movement disorder in humans called paroxysmal nonkinesigenic dyskinesia. Overexpression of PNKD has also been associated with multiple cancers, including pancreatic ductal adenocarcinoma, gastric cancer, ovarian cancer, and breast cancer and may serve as a therapeutic target for treating these cancers or a biomarker for assessing patient outcomes. The signaling pathways involved may vary depending on the cancer. For instance, in human breast cancer (MCF7) cells, PNKD may promote tumor cell proliferation by activating the MEK/ERK signaling pathway, while in human hepatoma (HepG2) cells, PNKD may operate through the MLC2/FAK/AKT pathway.

Interactions 
PNKD has been shown to interact with:
 Rab3-interacting molecule (RIM)1
 RIM2

References